Aag Se Khelenge is a 1989 Hindi-language action film, produced by Pravesh Sippy under the N. N. Sippy Productions banner and directed by Bhaskar Shetty. It starred Jeetendra, Anil Kapoor, Meenakshi Sheshadri, Kimi Katkar in pivotal roles, with the music composed by R. D. Burman.

Plot
Inspector Shekhar Kapoor (Jeetendra) has only mission in life is to end the atrocities of the underworld don Zaka (Amrish Puri) and his son Shaka (Shakti Kapoor). In the course of his investigations, he bumps into a small-time criminal, Johny (Anil Kapoor), but as it turns out, Johny reveals that he is Raja Saxena, from Delhi and he has sneaked into Zaka's team in the guise of Johny only to destroy them. Shekhar and Raja decide to work together on their joint mission. However, tables turn when Shekhar discovers from his office in Delhi that harsh truth. Inspector Ravi Saxena is no more. He was killed around six months back. Pinky Saxena, a little child, has been traumatized by the brutal killing of her mother, Sharda, and father, Inspector Ravi Saxena, at the hands of Zaka and Shaka, so much that she is hysterical and has to, be institutionalized. Her only relative is Raja Saxena, who has sworn to avenge this killing. Raja can get away by identifying himself as his brother, with false identification. But will this escapade result in him avenging the brutal killings, or will they merely entangle him hopelessly with Inspector Shekhar and the law?

Cast
Jeetendra as Inspector Shekhar Kapoor 
Anil Kapoor as Raja Saxena / Johny
Meenakshi Sheshadri as Geeta
Kimi Katkar as Bijli
Shakti Kapoor as Shaka
Amrish Puri as Zaka
Raj Kiran as Inspector Rakesh
Satish Kaushik as Inspector Pardesi
Sharat Saxena as Ronnie D'Souza
Vikas Anand as Police Commissioner
Archana Joglekar as Sunita
Sarala Yeolekar as Sharda Saxena
Baby Guddu as Pinky Saxena
Arshad Warsi as Background dancer

Soundtrack 
The music of the film was given by R. D. Burman and lyrics were by Anand Bakshi. The following songs are in the movie:-

External links 
 

1989 films
1980s Hindi-language films
Films scored by R. D. Burman
Hindi-language action films